Jéssica Lisandra Manjenje Nogueira Silva (born 11 December 1994) is a Portuguese professional footballer who plays as a winger or forward for Benfica and the Portugal women's national team.

Club career

She had a half year spell with Swedish Damallsvenskan club Linköpings FC from July to December 2014 and played for Clube de Albergaria from 2014 until 2016. From 2017 to 2019 she played for Levante UD in Spain.

International career
In September 2011, Silva made her senior debut for the Portugal women's national football team, in a 1–0 UEFA Women's Euro 2013 qualifying defeat by Austria in Pombal.

Silva was named by coach Francisco Neto in the final 23-player Portugal squad for UEFA Women's Euro 2017 in the Netherlands. But in the last training session before departing for the tournament, she was injured. Diana Gomes was called up by Neto as her replacement.

International goals

Honors 
Benfica
 Campeonato Nacional Feminino: 2021–22
 Supertaça de Portugal: 2022
Lyon
 Division 1 Féminine: 2019–20
 UEFA Women's Champions League: 2019–20

Linköpings FC
 Svenska Cupen: 2014, 2015

References

External links
 
 Player national profile at FPF
 

1994 births
Living people
Portuguese sportspeople of Angolan descent
Portuguese expatriate sportspeople in Spain
Portuguese women's footballers
Portugal women's international footballers
Portuguese expatriate footballers
Expatriate women's footballers in Sweden
Expatriate women's footballers in France
Expatriate women's footballers in Spain
Portuguese expatriate sportspeople in France
Portuguese expatriate sportspeople in Sweden
Damallsvenskan players
Linköpings FC players
Women's association football wingers
Women's association football forwards
Levante UD Femenino players
S.C. Braga (women's football) players
Clube de Albergaria players
S.L. Benfica (women) footballers
Campeonato Nacional de Futebol Feminino players
Olympique Lyonnais Féminin players
Primera División (women) players
Black Portuguese sportspeople
National Women's Soccer League players
UEFA Women's Euro 2022 players